BEW or Bew may refer to:

 Beira Airport IATA code, Mozambique
 Board of Economic Warfare in the United States during World War II
 Ballistic eyewear, a form of glasses or goggles that protect from small projectiles and fragments
 Bew, a provability formula in Gödel's incompleteness theorems
 Bew (surname) list of people with surname Bew or Bews
 Berwickshire, historic county in Scotland, Chapman code
 Burma Economic Watch